Glyphodes doleschalii is a moth of the family Crambidae described by Julius Lederer in 1863. It is found in Queensland in northern Australia.

References

External links
 "Glyphodes doleschalii Lederer, 1863". Australian Moths Online. CSIRO. image

Moths of Australia
Moths described in 1863
Glyphodes